Heng On is a station on the  of Hong Kong MTR, named after the nearby Heng On Estate. It also serves other residential areas like Kam Fung Court, Kam On Court, Baycrest, Vista Paradiso, and Yiu On Estate. It also serves over 10 schools (including Renaissance College) and two sports centres – Ma On Shan Sports Ground and Heng On Sports Centre.

The print featured on the platform pillars and glass barrier is of farmland which used to exist in the Ma On Shan area.

History
The name of the station was formally announced by KCR Corporation in 2000. Heng On station opened along with the rest of the Ma On Shan line on 21 December 2004.

The platform was doubled in length in 2014 as part of the Sha Tin to Central Link, which will extend the Ma On Shan line trains from four cars to eight cars.

The Ma On Shan Line was renamed Tuen Ma Line Phase 1 at the time. Heng On station became an intermediate station on this temporary new line. 

Hence, Heng On was included in the project and is now an intermediate station on the Tuen Ma line, Hong Kong's longest railway line.

Station layout

Platforms 1 and 2 share the same island platform. There is a subway to Renaissance College using Exit A.

Entrances/exits
A: Vista Paradiso 
B: Heng On Estate 
C: Kam Fung Court

References

MTR stations in the New Territories
Ma On Shan line
Tuen Ma line
Ma On Shan
Former Kowloon–Canton Railway stations
Railway stations in Hong Kong opened in 2004